Chepén District is one of three districts of the province Chepén in Peru. It is the second largest city of La Libertad, rice production center in the valleys of Chepen and Jequetepeque, and an active trading activities with neighboring Guadalupe and San Pedro de Lloc and other towns. It has factories in industrial dyes, food and primary production.

References